Ed Hargrove is an American former professional football player and coach.

Biography

Early life and education
Hargrove was born in Norfolk, Virginia. He completed his undergraduate studies in Health and Physical Education at East Carolina University prior to being signed as a professional football player. He later completed a master's degree in Community Counseling at Barry University.

Career
Hargrove was signed by the Pittsburgh Steelers in 1964. He also played for the Minnesota Vikings and the CFL Montreal Alouettes.

After retiring from playing, he worked as a strength coach for the Miami Hurricanes football team and the Atlanta Falcons, where he was named the NFC Pro Bowl Strength Coach in 1981.

References

Year of birth missing (living people)
Living people
Barry University alumni
East Carolina Pirates football players
Minnesota Vikings players
Montreal Alouettes players
Pittsburgh Steelers players